The Miss New Mexico competition is the pageant that selects the representative for the state of New Mexico in the Miss America pageant. 

Kaitlin Kerl of Albuquerque was crowned Miss New Mexico 2022 on June 11, 2022 at the Flickinger Center of Performing Arts in Alamogordo, New Mexico. She competed for the title of Miss America 2023 at the Mohegan Sun in Uncasville, Connecticut in December 2022.

Results summary
The following is a visual summary of the past results of Miss New Mexico titleholders at the national Miss America pageants/competitions. The year in parentheses indicates the year of the national competition during which a placement and/or award was garnered, not the year attached to the contestant's state title.

Placements
 Top 7: Nicole Miner (2010)
 Top 10: Myrtice Conn (1962), Jane Nelson (1965), Sharon Kaye Birkenbuel (1967), Pat Brummett (1970), Donna Frances Reel (1975), Valerie Faber (1986)
 Top 15: Taylor Rey (2018)

Awards

Preliminary awards
 Preliminary Lifestyle and Fitness: Jane Nelson (1965)
 Preliminary Talent: Pat Brummett (1970)

Non-finalist awards
 Non-finalist Interview: Susan Yara (2005), Alexis Duprey (2014), Marissa Livingston (2016)
 Non-finalist Talent: Shirley Hughes (1949), Rosemary Brown (1968)

Other awards
 Miss Congeniality: Glynnelle Hubbard (1958), Karen Jan Maciolek (1969)
 Charles and Theresa Brown Scholarship: Nicole Miner (2010)
 STEM Scholarship Award Winners: Jessica Burson (2015)

Winners

Notes

References

External links
 Miss New Mexico official website

New Mexico
New Mexico culture
Women in New Mexico